Frederick I. Zarr (born September 26, 1955) is an American musician, record producer, composer and arranger based in Brooklyn, New York. The CEO of BiZarr Music, Inc., he works alongside numerous artists, singers,  songwriters, musicians, & audio engineers at his Brooklyn recording studio - “Z Studio”.

Production
Among notable artists with whom Zarr has collaborated musically are: Madonna, on her self-titled début album; Village People – he co-wrote their album Sex Over The Phone, Debbie Gibson on various albums and songs including "Only in My Dreams"; Samantha Fox; Up Front; Pretty Poison; and Eartha Kitt's 1983 dance club hit, "Where Is My Man". Zarr's music is also heard on various radio and television commercials (which air in the United States and France).

He has also worked with the following artists:

Albums

Singles

Musical collaborations

 
 Phil Ramone
 Richard Perry
 Reggie Lucas
 Kashif
 Arthur Baker
 Jellybean
 Madonna
 Stephen Bray
 Shep Pettibone
 John Luongo
 Mark Kamins
 Johnny Kemp
 Stew Lane and the Untouchables
 Tina B
 Steve Thompson
 M & M Productions
 François Kevorkian
 Taylor Dayne
 
 Jacques Morali
 Mick Jagger
 The Rolling Stones
 Jerry Ragovoy
 Four Tops
 Toni Basil
 Fleetwood Mac
 Sheree Jeacocke
 Brenda K. Starr (Beat Street) 
 Marshall Crenshaw
 Ben E. King
 Herbie Hancock
 Eddie Money
 Taj Mahal
 Evelyn King
 Tee Scott
 Tom Moulton
 Bert Reid
 Raymond Reid

References

Living people
American hi-NRG musicians
American dance musicians
American rhythm and blues keyboardists
American boogie musicians
American electro musicians
American garage house musicians
1955 births